Wellingtonbridge railway station served the town of Wellingtonbridge and nearby Maudlintown in County Wexford, Ireland.

Description
The station was staffed and had an island platform; it was not wheelchair-accessible. It had the only passing loop on the mothballed Waterford-Rosslare section of the Limerick–Rosslare railway line. The station was used for loading of sugar beet trains until the last sugar factory (at Mallow) closed after the 2005 season.

The station opened on 1 August 1906 and closed on 18 September 2010.

Replacement bus service
The rail service was replaced by a revised Bus Éireann route 370 from Monday 20 September 2010. Once a week Bus Éireann routes 372 (New Ross-Foulkesmill-Wexford) and 373 (New Ross-Fethard-on-Sea-Wexford) also serve Wellingtonbridge.

See also
 List of railway stations in Ireland

References

External links
Irish Rail webpage for Wellingtonbridge station

Iarnród Éireann stations in County Wexford
Disused railway stations in County Wexford
Railway stations opened in 1906
Railway stations closed in 2010
1906 establishments in Ireland
2010 disestablishments in Ireland
Railway stations in the Republic of Ireland opened in the 20th century